The 1964 Democratic National Convention of the Democratic Party, took place at Boardwalk Hall in Atlantic City, New Jersey from August 24 to 27, 1964. President Lyndon B. Johnson was nominated for a full term. Senator Hubert H. Humphrey of Minnesota was nominated for vice president.

The convention took place less than a year after President John F. Kennedy was assassinated in Dallas, Texas. On the last day of the convention, Kennedy's brother Attorney General Robert F. Kennedy introduced a short film in honor of his brother's memory. After Kennedy appeared on the convention floor, delegates erupted in 22 minutes of uninterrupted applause, causing him to nearly break into tears. Speaking about his brother's vision for the country, Robert Kennedy quoted from Romeo and Juliet: "When he shall die, take him and cut him out into the stars, and he shall make the face of heaven so fine that all the world will be in love with night and pay no worship to the garish sun." The Keynote speech was then delivered by Senator John O. Pastore, of Rhode Island, where he spoke passionately of the party's success and in remembrance of President Kennedy. Pastore was later featured on the cover of The New York Times and Life magazine for the success of the address.

Adlai E. Stevenson II, Ambassador to the United Nations and twice a Democratic nominee for President, received a short, but polite ovation before introducing a memorial film the same day for former First Lady Eleanor Roosevelt, who had died on November 7, 1962. By August 26, 1964, 14,000 retirees from the N. C. S. C. (National Council Of Senior Citizens) arrived at the Convention, to encourage President Johnson to extend public health insurance to millions of Americans. In July 1965, Medicare was signed into law in front of former President Harry S. Truman, whose push for N. H. I. (National Health Insurance) had collapsed, nearly two decades earlier.

Mississippi controversy

At the national convention the integrated Mississippi Freedom Democratic Party (MFDP) claimed the seats for delegates for Mississippi, on the grounds that the official Mississippi delegation had been elected in violation of the party's rules because blacks had been systematically excluded from voting in the primaries, and participating in the precinct and county caucuses and the state convention; whereas the MFDP delegates had all been elected in strict compliance with party rules. The MFDP prepared a legal brief detailing the reasons why the "regular" Mississippi delegation did not adequately represent their state's residents, including the tactics employed to exclude participation by Black citizens. Jack Minnis wrote, "MFDP, with the help of SNCC, produced brochures, mimeographed biographies of the MFDP delegates, histories of the MFDP, legal arguments, historical arguments, moral arguments" that were distributed to all of the Convention's delegates. 
The Democratic Party referred the challenge to the convention credentials committee. The MFDP delegates lobbied and argued their case, and large groups of supporters and volunteers established an around-the-clock picket line on the boardwalk just outside the convention.

The credentials committee televised its proceedings, which allowed the nation to see and hear the testimony of the MFDP delegates, particularly the testimony of vice-chairperson Fannie Lou Hamer. She gave a moving and evocative portrayal of her hard brutalized life as a sharecropper on a cotton plantation in the Mississippi Delta and the retaliation inflicted on her for trying to register to vote.

The party's liberal leaders, led by Congresswoman Edith Green supported an even division of the seats between the two delegations. But Johnson was concerned that, while the regular Democrats of Mississippi would probably vote for Goldwater anyway, rejecting them would lose him the South. Eventually, Hubert Humphrey, Walter Reuther and the black civil rights leaders including Roy Wilkins and Bayard Rustin worked out a compromise: two of the 68 MFDP delegates chosen by Johnson would be made at-large delegates and the remainder would be non-voting guests of the convention; the regular Mississippi delegation was required to pledge to support the party ticket; and no future Democratic convention would accept a delegation chosen by a discriminatory poll.

Joseph Rauh, the MFDP's lawyer, initially refused this deal, but eventually urged the MFDP to accept it. But the MFDP delegates refused because by accepting the official all-white Mississippi delegation, the party validated a process in which blacks had been denied their constitutional right to vote and participate in the political process. They felt that because the MFDP had conducted their delegate selection process according to the party rules, they should be seated as the Mississippi delegation, not just a token two of them as at-large delegates. Many civil rights activists were deeply offended by the convention's outcome. As leader (and later Representative) John Lewis said, "We had played by the rules, done everything we were supposed to do, had played the game exactly as required, had arrived at the doorstep and found the door slammed in our face."

Many white delegates from Mississippi and Alabama refused to sign any pledge, and left the convention. In all, "43 of the 53 members of the Alabama delegation . . . refused to pledge their support for the national ticket of Johnson and Hubert Humphrey and were denied seating."

Coverage of Atlantic City
The convention was intended to boost Atlantic City's image as a premier travel destination in the United States. Instead the DNC exposed the demise of the city. Atlantic City faced criticism for poor quality hotels and the streets and buildings were dirty.  The decrepitness of Atlantic City was particularly present in comparison to San Francisco, California, an emerging city, that was the site of the 1964 Republican National Convention. This perceived decline in Atlantic City lead to the city becoming a hub for casinos and gambling.

Nominations

President Johnson announced his long-expected candidacy for a full term just days before the convention started. The favorite son candidates who had run in his place then withdrew, his name was the only one placed in nomination, and for the last time, the presidential roll-call vote was dispensed with. Johnson was nominated by voice vote.

The Balloting:

The Vice Presidency

With the office of Vice President vacant since the murder of President Kennedy nine months previous, the question of who would fill it was paramount on the minds of the "chattering classes". It had been rumored that the President was going to choose his predecessor's brother-in-law Sargent Shriver but that Robert F. Kennedy had nixed this idea, claiming that he wasn't a real Kennedy and it would be impolitic to choose him. The Attorney General made it known that he deserved the second spot instead, but then President Johnson announced that sitting Cabinet members would not be under consideration.

Speculation centered on Senate Majority Whip Hubert H. Humphrey, a perennial candidate who had run for either the presidential or vice presidential nomination in every election since 1952, and was a champion of civil rights. On the second day of the convention, LBJ invited Humphrey and Connecticut Senator Thomas Dodd to the White House for an extended job interview. After a long wait, the President announced that his choice was Humphrey, who was nominated by voice vote the following day.

Gallery

See also
 1964 Republican National Convention
 1964 United States presidential election
 History of the United States Democratic Party
 List of Democratic National Conventions
 United States presidential nominating convention
 1964 Democratic Party presidential primaries
 Southern strategy

References

External links
 Democratic Party Platform of 1964 at The American Presidency Project
 Johnson Nomination Acceptance Speech for President at DNC (transcript) at The American Presidency Project
 Video of Johnson nomination acceptance speech for President at DNC (via YouTube)
 Audio of Johnson nomination acceptance speech for President at DNC
 Video of Humphrey nomination acceptance speech for Vice President at DNC (via YouTube)
 Audio of Humphrey nomination acceptance speech for Vice President at DNC
 Transcript of Humphrey nomination acceptance speech for Vice President at DNC
 Johnny Carson (in earliest known preserved color video monologue) DNC jokes, 24 August 1964
 How 14,000 retirees fought for Medicare and won, within a year.

Democratic National Conventions
Democratic National Convention, 1964
Democratic National Convention
Democratic National Convention
Political conventions in New Jersey
New Jersey Democratic State Committee
Political events in New Jersey
Democratic National Convention
Democratic National Convention
Articles containing video clips